Shahrvand-e-Emrooz was a Persian-language weekly news magazine that was in circulation between March 2007 and September 2011.

History and profile
Shahrvand-e-Emrooz was launched in March 2007. Mohammad Ghoochani and Mohammad Reza Khojasteh Rahimi served as the editor-in-chief of the weekly. The magazine, based in Tehran, was a reformist publication and was the Persian version of TIME magazine. Shahrvand-e-Emrooz published significant interviews with leading figures, including Hassan Rouhani in 2008 and Hassan Khomeini, grandson of Ayatollah Khomeini, in February 2008.

Bans and closure
Shahrvand-e-Emrooz was first closed down when it published a picture of U.S. President Barack Obama and his daughter on the cover of its 8 November 2008 issue. The weekly was also shut down in June 2009 following the presidential election. The publication resumed on 2 July 2011, but it was again closed down in September 2011 due to the publication of a digital picture which mocked former President Mahmoud Ahmedinejad and his confidant Esfandiar Rahim Mashaei.

References

2007 establishments in Iran
2011 disestablishments in Iran
Censorship in Iran
Defunct magazines published in Iran
Defunct political magazines
Magazines established in 2007
Magazines disestablished in 2011
Magazines published in Tehran
News magazines published in Asia
Persian-language magazines
Weekly magazines published in Iran
Banned magazines